Maurino is a rural locality (a village) in Mayskoye Rural Settlement, Vologodsky District, Vologda Oblast, Russia. The population was 7 as of 2002.

Geography 
The distance to Vologda is 34 km, to Maysky is 5 km. Molochnaya is the nearest  locality.
there are 4 villages in the region of Maurino and Lake Maurinskoye with mount Maura form a bracket like a swastika

References 

Rural localities in Vologodsky District